The 1999 European Youth Summer Olympic Days was the fifth edition of multi-sport event for European youths between the ages of 12 and 18. It was held in Esbjerg, Denmark from 10 to 16 July. A total of eleven sports were contested.

Sports

Participating nations

Medal table

References

Bell, Daniel (2003). Encyclopedia of International Games. McFarland and Company, Inc. Publishers, Jefferson, North Carolina. .
Medal table
Tableau des médailles Esbjerg - Danemark (1999). French Olympic Committee. Retrieved on 2014-11-23.

 
1999
European Youth Summer Olympic Days
European Youth Summer Olympic Days
European Youth Summer Olympic Days
Multi-sport events in Denmark
Sport in Esbjerg
Youth sport in Denmark
July 1999 sports events in Europe